Solovyovka is a rural locality (a village) in Podlesnensky Selsoviet, Sterlitamaksky District, Bashkortostan, Russia. The population was 12 as of 2010. There is 1 street.

Geography 
Solovyovka is located 50 km north of Sterlitamak (the district's administrative centre) by road. Staromakarovo is the nearest rural locality.

References 

Rural localities in Sterlitamaksky District